The Hodiș is a left tributary of the river Crișul Alb in Romania. It flows into the Crișul Alb near Bârsa. Part of its flow is diverted into the Canalul Morilor, which flows parallel to the south of the Crișul Alb.

References

Rivers of Romania
Rivers of Arad County